"Sometimes It's Only Love" is a 1991 song by American recording artist Luther Vandross. The single was released in 1992 in support of his album Power of Love. The song was a top ten hit (at No. 9) on the Billboard's Hot R&B Singles and Hot Adult Contemporary Tracks.

Critical reception
Stephen Thomas Erlewine from AllMusic picked the song as one of the "high points" of the album. Larry Flick from Billboard wrote, "This time, Vandross reaffirms his position as a virtually peerless romantic crooner with a lush and soulful ballad. A simply lovely song that will sound wonderful on the radio." A reviewer from People Magazine stated in the review of Power of Love, that on the song, "the voice, material and studio technique balance".

Charts

Weekly charts

Year-end charts

References

External links
 www.luthervandross.com

1992 songs
Luther Vandross songs
1992 singles
Songs written by Luther Vandross
Epic Records singles